The Foggy Dew is the debut album by Irish folk and rebel band The Wolfe Tones. The album is named after and features the song of the same name. Most of the songs on the album are old folk songs recorded by the band such as "The Sash", "Follow Me Up to Carlow " and "Roisin Dubh"; however, there are a number of original tracks.

Track listing 

 "The Singing Bird"
 "Down in the Mines"
 "Dicey Reilly"
 "Galway Races"
 "Louse House In Killkenny"
 "The Diamond"
 "The Zoological Gardens"
 "The Foggy Dew"
 "The Peeler and the Goat
 "The Sash"
 "Limerick Rake"
 "Dry Land Sailors"
 "Follow Me Up to Carlow"
 "The Hills of Glenswilly"
 "The Boys of Wexford"
 "Roisin Dubh

The Wolfe Tones albums
1965 debut albums